Daniil Ilyich Konstantinov (born February 5, 1984) is a Russian opposition politician, lawyer, human rights activist. The leader of the civil movement "Moscow Defense League". Member of the organizing committee meetings "For Fair Elections". In the past, activist of the movement "The People", the leader of "Change", a member of the party "A Just Russia". Since 2012 — member of Russian Opposition Coordination Council.

Biography
Born in Leningrad in family of later known Russian politician Ilya Konstantinov. In 1992 the family moved to Moscow. Graduated Russian State Social University, received a law degree. Studied in graduate school, was teaching. Married.

Politics
Daniil began participate in society when he still a student. In 2004, he ran for election in the Moscow City Duma.

In 2005, together with colleagues and friends organized a steering committee for the creation of socio-political party "Change". Then in 2005 he took part in the elections to the State Duma as a self-promoter.

2006-2007: chief editor of "Country and Society"; correspondent of Regnum.ru, site "Open Letter to the Government", organizer and director of the Support center of non-profit organizations. In early 2007 he was engaged in union of opposition forces under the auspices of the "Popular Front". In summer 2007, joined the movement "The People" (Navalny, Miloserdov, Gulyaev, Prilepin etc.). The fall of 2007 entered the working group on the draft law "On progressive taxation." From November 2007 to 2008 was in the party "A Just Russia". Was the head of the youth wing of the party "A Just Russia" in the North-Eastern Administrative Okrug.

April 22, 2008 held a conference at the Higher School of Economics, "The Future of Russia. Prospects for Development" dedicated to results of the presidential elections in Russia and their possible socio-economic and political consequences.

In 2011, he represented the interests of Eduard Limonov in court towards registration of the party "The Other Russia". In May 2011, together with some young political activists announced the foundation of the organizing committee revived the National Salvation Front.

Prosecution
On March 22, 2012, Konstantinov was arrested in his apartment. He was charged in a domestic murder. Konstantinov claims that the case was inspired by members of the General Directorate for Combating Extremism (Center "E") after he had refused to cooperate. From the decision to conduct a criminal case investigation group from March 5, 2012 and April 4, 2012, it became known that the operational support of a criminal investigation against Daniil Konstantinov carries General Directorate for Combating Extremism and management of Federal Security Service.

After the protest rally "For Fair Elections!" on December 5, when Daniil was arrested and was in the chamber he has had a conversation with officer of Center "E" which did not introduce himself. Officer suggested Daniil to engage in informative activities; when officer received a firm refusal, he expressed in Daniil's address the threat: "I'll roll up you to the asphalt" and "Where I am — there corpses and long terms".

Yulia Latynina said that the case of Konstantinov it is an extremely rare incident of political persecution on trumped-up criminal charges in modern Russia. He is the only nationalist which Memorial Centre considers political prisoners.

Public campaign of Konstantinov protection
Duma deputies spoke in support of Daniil and also Dmitry Gudkov, Ilya Ponomarev, Alexander Khinshtein, D. Gorovtsa, opposition leaders Sergei Udaltsov, Sergey Baburin, Vladimir Milov, Boris Nemtsov have sent their parliamentary inquiries.

Opposition leaders wrote a collective letter to Yuri Chaika with a requirement "to take control of the investigation of the Daniil Ilich Konstantinov's case and provide objective and impartial to all the circumstances of this case". The letter was signed by Sergey Baburin, Dmitry Gudkov, Garry Kasparov, Konstantin Krylov, Eduard Limonov, Vladimir Milov, Boris Nemtsov, Valery Solovei, Vladimir Tor, Yegor Kholmogorov, Nadezhda Shalimova, Rostislav Antonov.

Recognition the Konstantinov as political prisoner
Daniil Konstantinov recognized as political prisoners according to the human rights organization "Memorial".

Vladimir Putin about the Daniil Konstantinov's case
During the press conference, Putin answered questions of Znak.com correspondent Ekaterina Vinokurova, who was interested in opinion of the head of state about the repressive nature of the Russian judicial system.

— Now acquittals less 1% — less than under Stalin, — Catherine recalled. — Responding to a similar question, you said that, then, investigation works well. But it is not. Enough to look at the processes on the same Bolotnaya case or cases of Aksana Panova, Daniil Konstantinov.

— I agree with you that we need to seek purity of court decisions, verdicts, improve the quality of the preliminary investigation, judicial investigation, — said Putin. — All of this should be done. But I want to assure you that in fact it is a problem not only in our country. Everywhere there is a miscarriage of justice, any negligence in the investigation and interrogation apparatus and the judiciary. But we must work on this together, including through the media. I also say this quite seriously, without irony any jokes. We are often faced with dishonesty and some substandard work. It happens. And, of course, we have to react to this and try to do it. But I want to pay your attention to the fact that decisions on amnesty just due to the fact to close this topic, flip it. And do everything possible in moving forward, and together with the representatives of civil society, and the law enforcement system, and with the state and other authorities destinations. Okay?

Last Konstantinov's word
In Russia is formed a police state. And the government is based on fear and submission. Free human personality, professing their own views and ideas alien to the police state. It does not belong here.
I do not fall under any of the types of people that are convenient for the police state. I do not work in the system, I refused recruitment to the Center for Combating Extremism. I do not wanna run away, I want to continue to struggle here in this country, for our rights. I do not recognize the games and manipulations, when the government forces us to face each other and ignore our common interests. And finally, I do not like to obey. I believe that the human person has a right to free development, especially in the modern world. All these facts together, against the backdrop of increasing political trends expressed in mass protests, the obvious political crisis of 2011-2012, led to the fact that namely Daniil Konstantinov as the least comfortable of all opposition spokesman, was charged with such a heavy crime.
You ask me, well, and what about the rest? Why me? Well, first, with others not all so smoothly. And here, in this hall, there are people who have been convicted on political charges, such as Konstantin Krylov. We know many of those who are now being persecuted for a variety of formulations — from Alexei Navalny to Sergei Udaltsov. As for the rest, it is best to ask them why they are not in prison. There are many of those who position themselves as radical revolutionaries who propose radical slogans, but after this follows nothing. And here is something to ponder.

Torture of a political prisoner
Before the verdict was read Konstantinov was tortured. Konstantinov was threatened, forced to strip naked and began to use a stun gun. After these long bullying Daniil fainted. As soon as he woke up, he was allowed to get dressed, put in a chamber-"glass", he began to demand him release and stop bullying. These calls made the police even more angry, they grabbed the hands of Daniil and put on "stretching" with handcuffs. In this position, he spent about two hours before the meeting and then after — another four hours.
"After Daniil was taken to detention center, where was recorded his injuries. I have not read the medical report, but I saw on his body handcuff marks and bruises on his right arm and redness on the belly of stun gun use. We think that it was not necessary as the use of physical force, and the arrival of immediate response to the Moscow City Court", — says Shkred, Daniil's lawyer.

Verdict
Konstantinov was not found guilty of murder but at the same time was not justified.

Konstantinov culture
 April 7, 2014 in the theater "Torch" Premieres Alexei Dykhovichnyi "Falsification. Daniil Konstantinov process" or simply "Falsification". The premiere was held at the Center for Sakharov.

Comment Vladimir Ryzhkov:
 Another 100% falsified case. 
Quote Alexei Dykhovichnyi:
 If we are really short, this is a film about the injustice towards the individual. This injustice is shown in the film and clearly documented . Today, this level of injustice is unique even for our justice system, but whether there will be . As is well known, only scary the first time only.
If the Russian Themis and make this step towards condemnation of an innocent, tomorrow anyone can be arrested and jailed on charges of first that fell, and no evidence of innocence will not help him . As they say all the experts with whom I could talk to, yet this does not happen, but it can become Konstantinova Rubikon. 

 August 26, 2013 at 14 o'clock artist Alec Petuk spent a quiet campaign " The Art of Contemplation of Nature" at the hearing in the case of political prisoner Daniil Konstantinov

References

External links
 Publications Daniil Konstantinov
 Against breakage has a reception. What actually judged nationalist Daniil Konstantinov
 Interview ru_nsn (March 19, 2012) 
 Documentary about Konstantinov

1984 births
Living people
Lawyers from Saint Petersburg
Russian State Social University alumni
Russian human rights activists
Russian politicians
Russian prisoners and detainees
Russian activists against the 2022 Russian invasion of Ukraine